Snake's Got a Leg is the debut album of Sunset Rubdown. It was released in July 2005 on the Global Symphonic label.
Most of the material on this album was recorded by Spencer Krug using a cheap microphone connected to a standard PC in his bedroom.  The songs were compiled from five different EPs, each in a different genre.

Track listing
 "The Dust You Kick Up Is Too Fine" – 0:59
 "Snake's Got a Leg" – 4:01
 "I'll Believe in Anything, You'll Believe in Anything" – 4:48
 "Hey You Handsome Vulture" – 1:34
 "Hope You Don't Stoop to Dirty Words" – 4:10
 "Hope You Don't Stoop to Dirty Words II" – 2:46
 "Cecil's Bells" – 1:44
 "I Know the Weight of Your Throat" – 2:50
 "Sol's Song" – 4:03
 "Stadiums and Shrines" – 2:59
 "Snake's Got a Leg II" – 3:51
 "Portrait of a Shiny Metal Little Boy" – 1:20

All songs written and recorded by Spencer Krug (except tracks 3, 5, and 11 were recorded by Arlen Thompson)

Credits
 Banjo and harmonica by Paul Sischy
 Cover art by Spencer Krug

References

2005 debut albums
Sunset Rubdown albums